Concord is an unincorporated community in Fannett Township, Franklin County, Pennsylvania, United States. Concord has a post office, with ZIP code 17217.

Concord was platted in 1797, and named after the Battle of Concord. A post office called Concord has been in operation since 1811.

References

Unincorporated communities in Franklin County, Pennsylvania
Unincorporated communities in Pennsylvania